This glossary of journalism is a list of definitions of terms and concepts used in journalism, its sub-disciplines, and related fields, including news reporting, publishing, broadcast journalism, and various types of journalistic media.

A

B

C

D

E

F

G

H

I

J

K

L

M

N

O

P

Q

R

S

T

U

V

W

Y

Z

See also
Glossary of broadcasting terms
Lists of journalists
List of journalism awards
Outline of journalism

References

External links
The News Manual – Journalism & Media Glossary

 
Journalism
Journalism
Journalism
Wikipedia glossaries using description lists